Friedrich Lippmann (6 October 1838 in Prague – 2 October 1903 in Berlin) was a German art historian and director of the Kupferstichkabinett, Berlin State Museums, noted for his work on Dürer, Holbein and Italian 15th-century woodcuts. Max Jakob Friedländer, who was later to become the noted scholar Early Netherlandish painting and the Northern Renaissance, worked under Lippmann in 1891 as a volunteer assisting with Lippmann's graphics collection.

Selected publications
 Zeichnungen von Albrecht Dürer (Berlin: G. Grote, 1883–1929) [vols. 6-7 completed by Friedrich Winkler]
 The Art of Wood-engraving in Italy in the Fifteenth Century, 3 vols. (London: B. Quaritch, 1888)

Other sources
Achenbach, S. (1996). Das Berliner Kupferstichkabinett und die französische Kunst unter Friedrich Lippmann und Max Lehrs.

References

German art historians
1838 births
1903 deaths
Artists from Prague
German Bohemian people